Defiance is a 1980 American action neo noir crime film starring Jan-Michael Vincent, Art Carney, and Theresa Saldana. The film was an early Jerry Bruckheimer production.

The film was unsuccessful upon release, both with critics and the public, though it was shown often on cable film channels (such as HBO) in the early 1980s.

Plot
The film follows Tommy, a suspended young seaman (Jan-Michael Vincent) who takes up temporary housing in a New York neighborhood while waiting for his next orders to ship out. The neighborhood is controlled by a gang called 'The Souls', led by Angel Cruz (Rudy Ramos), who steal and rob at will. No one will press charges due to fear of retribution, so Tommy takes matters into his own hands to combat the growing violence, spurring his fellow neighbors to join him.

Cast
Jan-Michael Vincent as Tommy 
Theresa Saldana as Marsha 
Art Carney as Abe 
Danny Aiello as Carmine 
Rudy Ramos as Angel Cruz 
Lenny Montana as Whacko 
Joseph Campanella as Karenski
Santos Morales as Paolo 
Fernando López as Kid
Frank Pesce as Herbie

Production
John Flynn later said working with Jan Michael Vincent was difficult:
Jan was a drinker even then. He had Heinekens for breakfast. There was a night scene where we literally had to prop him up. Poor Jan. He latched onto Danny Aiello. Jan loved Danny and tried to give him more of his own lines in the picture. I told Jan he couldn’t mess with the script like that. But Jan was a sweet guy. He never believed that he was an actor, though. He was embarrassed to be an actor. He always thought he was doing an awful job and that people were laughing at him. You had to keep telling him he was wonderful and he would do whatever you wanted him to do. Jan was like a little kid, but he just didn’t believe in himself. Talk about actors’ egos. He was the opposite. This was an actor with a non-ego.

References

External links

American crime drama films
Films produced by Jerry Bruckheimer
1980 crime drama films
American vigilante films
Films directed by John Flynn
Films scored by Dominic Frontiere
Films shot in New York City
Films set in New York City
1980s vigilante films
1980s English-language films
1980s American films